is a Japanese cyclist. He competed in two events at the 1992 Summer Olympics. He is also a professional keirin cyclist with over 600 wins. He won the best keirin cyclist of the year award in 2007.

References

1969 births
Living people
Japanese male cyclists
Olympic cyclists of Japan
Cyclists at the 1992 Summer Olympics
Sportspeople from Ishikawa Prefecture
Cyclists at the 1990 Asian Games
Asian Games medalists in cycling
Asian Games gold medalists for Japan
Keirin cyclists
Medalists at the 1990 Asian Games
20th-century Japanese people